The 2012 Gran Piemonte was the 98th edition of the Gran Piemonte (known as Giro del Piemonte until 2009) single-day cycling race. It was held on 27 September 2012, over a distance of 188 km, starting in Fossano and ending in Biella.

Teams
The start list included 18 teams, with 11 ProTour teams, and more than 150 riders. Among them, the 2008 World Champion Alessandro Ballan, the 2012 Giro d'Italia winner Ryder Hesjedal, the 2006 Milano-Sanremo winner Filippo Pozzato, and the 2008 Olympic Champion Samuel Sánchez.

Results

References

Gran Piemonte
2012 in Italian sport
Giro del Piemonte